"Merry Go Round" is a song by American hip hop artist Royce da 5'9", recorded as the third track on his fifth studio album Success Is Certain (2011). It features production from producer Nottz, who helped write the song along with Royce . Upon the release of Merry Go Round, the song received generally positive reviews from music critics, who praised its ambitious nature and production.

Background and composition
"Merry Go Round" was written by Royce da 5'9" and Nottz. It uses an unauthorized sample of the Björn & Benny (from ABBA) song Merry-Go-Round.

Along with most of the songs from Success Is Certain, "Merry Go Round" was recorded throughout the period in between 2010-2011 in Detroit, Michigan.

Other
This song was removed from iTunes because of the unauthorized sample.

2011 songs
Royce da 5'9" songs
Songs written by Royce da 5'9"